Ashland Pinnacle is a pillar in Greene County, New York. It is located in the Catskill Mountains north-northeast of Ashland. The Knob is located south, and Huntersfield Mountain is located west of Ashland Pinnacle.

References

Mountains of Greene County, New York
Mountains of New York (state)